The Constitution of Venezuela of 1858 was a constitution approved by the National Convention of Valencia on January 14, 1858 and promulgated by President Julián Castro, after the overthrow of the dictatorship of José Tadeo Monagas. This new Constitution granted more autonomy to the Provinces, the election of the president, vice-president and other officials by universal, direct and secret voting. It established presidential terms of 5 years.

History 
It was in force for a short time since the Federal War broke out on April 20, 1859, which prevented the normal operation of the Constitution and was finally repealed by the dictatorship of José Antonio Páez on September 10, 1861.

Characteristics 

 Greater autonomy is granted to the provinces.
 Universal, direct and secret voting is established for the president, vice-president and other government officials.
 The presidential term is reduced from 6 to 5 years.
 Provincial legislatures may elect members of the Supreme Court of Justice and members of the superior courts.

See also 

 March Revolution (Venezuela)

References 

Constitutions of Venezuela 
1858 in law 
1858 in politics